Minga may refer to:

 Minga (surname)
 Munich (Minga in the Austro-Bavarian language), the capital city of Bavaria, Germany
 Minga Branch, a stream in the United States
 Mink'a (hispanicized as minca, minga), a type of traditional communal work in the Andes
 Minga, a television character from The Gumby Show
 Mingə, a village in the Ismailli Rayon of Azerbaijan